Capila is a genus of spread-winged skippers in the family Hesperiidae.

Species
The following species are recognised  in the genus Capila:
 Capila jayadeva Moore, 1865
 Capila lidderdali  (Elwes, 1888)
 Capila penicillatum  (de Nicéville, 1893)
 Capila phanaeus  (Hewitson, 1867)
 Capila pieridoides  (Moore, 1878)
 Capila zennara  (Moore, 1865)

References

Natural History Museum Lepidoptera genus database
 Markku Savela's Lepidoptera and some other life forms

 
Tagiadini
Hesperiidae genera
Taxa named by Frederic Moore